Thurston Hollow (also known as Thurston Hollow Creek) is a tributary of Moneypenny Creek in Wyoming County, Pennsylvania, in the United States. Thurston Hollow is not designated as an impaired waterbody. The surficial geology in its vicinity consists of Wisconsinan Till, alluvium, and bedrock. It has one unnamed tributary.

Course

Thurston Hollow begins on the slopes of a ridge in Eaton Township. It flows north-northeast for several tenths of a mile, passing through a pond, receiving an unnamed tributary from the left, and enters a valley. The stream then turns nearly due north for several tenths of a mile and passes through another pond before turning east-northeast. Several hundred feet further downstream, it reaches its confluence with Moneypenny Creek.

Hydrology
Thurston Hollow is not designated as an impaired waterbody.

Geography and geology

The surficial geology along the lower reaches of Thurston Hollow mainly consists of alluvium. To the east, the surficial geology consists of bedrock and some Wisconsinan Till. To the west, the surficial geology consists entirely of Wisconsinan Till.

Watershed
The stream is entirely within the United States Geological Survey quadrangle of Center Moreland. Its designated use is for aquatic life.

Such a project would some stream reaches along at least one unnamed tributary to Thurston Hollow.

History
Thurston Hollow does not have a name of its own, but takes its name from the valley through which it flows. The valley of Thurston Hollow was entered into the Geographic Names Information System on August 2, 1979. Its identifier in the Geographic Names Information System is 1199681.

Thurston Hollow is also known as Thurston Hollow Creek.

Farming has been done in the vicinity of Thurston Hollow.

See also
List of rivers of Pennsylvania

References

Rivers of Wyoming County, Pennsylvania
Tributaries of the Susquehanna River
Rivers of Pennsylvania